Oscar Jacobsen (1 January 1850 – 6 August 1902) was a Norwegian engineer and politician for the Liberal Party.

Personal life
He was born in Vågå as the son of Johanne Georgine Jørgensen and her husband Nils Lauritz Severin Jacobsen. He had several brothers, among them Albert Marius Jacobsen, father of Rolf Jacobsen. Both Albert and Rolf would serve as national politicians.

In 1875 Oscar Jacobsen married Laura Sofie Fredrikke Dahl. The couple had several children, mostly girls.

Career
An engineer by education, he worked in the Norwegian State Railways.

He served in the cabinet Sverdrup as Minister of Labour from 5 March 1888 to 12 July 1889. From 28 August to 30 September 1888 he was also Minister of Interior.

References

1850 births
1902 deaths
Government ministers of Norway
Liberal Party (Norway) politicians
Norwegian engineers
Norwegian State Railways (1883–1996) people